Salerno Lake, formerly Devil's Lake, is a lake in the municipalities of Highlands East and Minden Hills in Haliburton County in Central Ontario, Canada. The lake is part of the Kawartha Lakes, and lies in the Great Lakes Basin. It is part of cottage country approximately a -hour drive away from Toronto.

Geography
It is a narrow lake, at most , that resembles a large river. The lake is in a big valley, and the water depth increases quickly.

Nearby communities are Gooderham, Irondale, and Kinmount; Haliburton is a 25–35 minute drive away.

The primary inflow, at the southwest, is Salerno Creek from White Lake. The primary outflow, at the northwest, is also Salerno Creek, which flows over a dam to the Irondale River, then via the Burnt River, the Kawartha Lakes, the Otonabee River and the Trent River to Lake Ontario.

History
Like many water bodies in this system, the lake was used to transport logs in the 19th and 20th Century.

Etymology
Originally named Devil's Lake, the name was changed to Salerno to commemorate the prominent role of the Canadian Army in the Salerno landings of 1943 at the Italian city of that name. The name change was suggested by the government of Ontario and published on a federal map in 1944 as a distinctive name in order to eliminate the common name "Devil". The name Salerno Lake was eventually approved by the Canadian Board on Geographical Names in 1953.

Natural history 
Salerno Lake is home to smallmouth bass, largemouth bass, perch, walleye, and muskie. It also has rock bass, sunfish, mussels, and crayfish.

Cottagers' Association 
The Salerno/Devil's Lake Cottagers' Association is over 40 years old. It consists of a board of directors that deal with issues and organize events such as the annual canoe race and the Canada Day fireworks. The association encourages all cottagers to become a member, and sends out a newsletter by mail.

See also
List of lakes in Ontario

References

Other map sources:

Lakes of Haliburton County